Walter Henry Hackett (August 15, 1857 – October 2, 1920) was a Major League Baseball shortstop. He played for the 1884 Boston Reds in the Union Association and the 1885 Boston Beaneaters in the National League. He later played in the minor leagues through 1889. His brother, Mert Hackett and cousins Dad Clarkson, John Clarkson and Walter Clarkson all also played professional baseball.

Sources

Major League Baseball shortstops
Boston Reds (UA) players
Boston Beaneaters players
Baseball players from Massachusetts
19th-century baseball players
1857 births
1920 deaths
Kansas City Cowboys (minor league) players
Rochester Maroons players
Troy Trojans (minor league) players
Hartford Dark Blues (minor league) players
Lowell (minor league baseball) players
Family History, great-grandson Walter Henry Hackett, III, Attorney at Law, CA SBN230607